Act of Congress is a Birmingham, Alabama based singer-songwriter group. They play only acoustic instruments in their music, giving them a sound that is unique, meshing several genres of music together.  Their first performance of the debut album Declaration sold out at WorkPlay Theater in Birmingham in 2008.

History
The group's founding members, Chris Griffin and Adam Wright, met in college. Wright, a pianist, and Griffin, a guitar player, were interested in converging the sounds of progressive bluegrass with softer pop melodies on acoustic instruments. In 2006, Tim Carroll, an upright bass player, was added to play instrumentation for Maylene and the Sons of Disaster's second album. Act of Congress has also played alongside several Symphonies, including the Alabama Symphony Orchestra in their annual "An Alabama Christmas" concert. On October 17, 2014, Act of Congress played with the Alabama Symphony Orchestra. The group has also been the opening act for Toby Keith and John Mayer.

In 2007, Bethany Borg joined the group after leaving several years performing in Branson, Missouri.
Connie Skellie is now active in the band (fiddler and vocalist) replacing Bethany Borg.

Discography
Love Remains EP - March 13, 2008
Declaration - September 5, 2008
Cover Up EP - October 1, 2009
Christmas Vol. 1 EP - November 24, 2011
Worth Fighting For - March 27, 2012
The Christmas Collection - November 4, 2016

References

American folk musical groups
Musical groups established in 2006
Musical groups from Birmingham, Alabama